This is a list of electoral results for the Division of Hawke in Australian federal elections from the division's creation in 2022 until the present.

Members

Election results

Elections in the 2020s

2022

References

External links
 Australian Electoral Commission. Federal election results
 Carr, Adam. Psephos

Australian federal electoral results by division